Entrainment may refer to:

 Air entrainment, the intentional creation of tiny air bubbles in concrete
 Brainwave entrainment, the practice of entraining one's brainwaves to a desired frequency
 Entrainment (biomusicology), the synchronization of organisms to an external rhythm
 Entrainment (chronobiology), the alignment of a circadian system's period and phase to the period and phase of an external rhythm
 Entrainment (engineering), the entrapment of one substance by another substance
 Entrainment (hydrodynamics), the movement of one fluid by another
 Entrainment (meteorology), a phenomenon of the atmosphere
 Entrainment (physical geography), the process by which surface sediment is incorporated into a fluid flow
 Entrainment (physics), the process whereby two interacting oscillating systems assume the same period
 Lexical entrainment, the process in conversational linguistics of the subject adopting the terms of their interlocutor

See also
 "That's Entrainment", a Van Morrison song
 Entrains-sur-Nohain, a commune in the Nièvre department in central France